The All India Centre of Trade Unions is a trade union centre in India. It is the labour wing of the Marxist Communist Party of India (United). Previously it was the trade union wing of the main predecessor of MCPI(U), the Marxist Communist Party of India.

M.S. Patrudu was the AICTU general secretary until his death in 2004. After the death of Patrudu, the position of general secretary was taken over by Malkiat Singh.

Important Actions

1. All India Centre of Trade Unions had supported Bharat Bandh organised by Samyukt Kisan Morcha (SKM) marking the first anniversary of the three farm laws in Bengaluru in September 2021.

References

Marxist Communist Party of India (United)
Trade unions in India
National trade union centres of India